Robert Theodor Văduva (born 5 September 1992 in Craiova) is a Romanian footballer who plays for FC U Craiova as a striker.

Career
While playing for Steaua II București, Robert was loaned out to Unirea Urziceni. He made his Liga I debut on 11 September 2010, in a match against Steaua București, coming off the bench to replace Alin Toșca in the 85th minute.

References

External links
 
 

Living people
1992 births
Romanian footballers
Association football forwards
Liga I players
Liga II players
FC Steaua II București players
FC Unirea Urziceni players
SCM Râmnicu Vâlcea players
AFC Chindia Târgoviște players
FC Dinamo București players
Sirens F.C. players
FC U Craiova 1948 players
Romanian expatriate footballers
Romanian expatriate sportspeople in Malta
Expatriate footballers in Malta
Sportspeople from Craiova